The 2015 Internazionali di Tennis Città di Vicenza was a professional tennis tournament played on clay courts. It was the second edition of the tournament which was part of the 2015 ATP Challenger Tour. It took place in Vicenza, Italy between 25 and 31 May May 2015.

Singles main-draw entrants

Seeds

Other entrants
The following players received wildcards into the singles main draw:
  Salvatore Caruso
  Matteo Donati
  Federico Gaio
  Stefano Napolitano

The following player received entry into the singles main draw as special exempt:
  Rémi Boutillier

The following players received entry from the qualifying draw:
  Pedro Cachín
  José Pereira
  Andrey Rublev
  Matteo Viola

Champions

Singles

 Íñigo Cervantes def.  John Millman 6–4, 6–2

Doubles

  Facundo Bagnis /  Guido Pella def.  Salvatore Caruso /  Federico Gaio 6–2, 6–4

External links
 Tournament website

Internazionali di Tennis Citta di Vicenza
Internazionali di Tennis Città di Vicenza
AON